Transient Random-Noise Bursts with Announcements is the second studio album by English-French rock band Stereolab, released on 24 August 1993 and was issued by Duophonic Records and Elektra Records. it was recorded with an expanded line-up, and is generally considered to the band's noisiest release due to its' emphasis on distorted guitars and keyboard sounds.

Composition
Shortly before the release of Transient Random-Noise Bursts, Stereolab re-recorded the song "Pack Yr Romantic Mind" to remove a sample from George Harrison's Wonderwall Music that they were denied clearance to use.

On the LP edition of the album, the end of the last track, "Lock-Groove Lullaby", extends into a locked groove repeating a phrase sampled from Perrey and Kingsley's "The Savers", from their 1967 album Kaleidoscopic Vibrations: Electronic Pop Music from Way Out.

Release
Transient Random-Noise Bursts was released on 24 August 1993 in the United States by Elektra Records, and on 6 September 1993 in the United Kingdom by Duophonic Records. The album's sleeve design was adapted from that of a hi-fi test record issued by Hi-Fi Sound magazine in 1969; the record itself is sampled on the song "Jenny Ondioline". The majority of the first 1,500 LP copies of Transient Random-Noise Bursts were destroyed due to bad pressing quality.

On its release, Transient Random-Noise Bursts peaked at number 62 on the UK Albums Chart. In advance of the album, "Jenny Ondioline" was released on 22 August 1993.

A remastered and expanded edition of Transient Random-Noise Bursts was released by Duophonic and Warp on 3 May 2019.

Track listing

Sample credits
 "Pack Yr Romantic Mind" embodies portions of "Strangers in the Night", written by Bert Kaempfert, Charles Singleton, and Eddie Snyder.
 "I'm Going Out of My Way" embodies portions of "One Note Samba", written by Antônio Jobim, Jon Hendricks, and Newton Mendonça.
 "Jenny Ondioline" contains samples from "Channel Recognition Phasing & Balance", used courtesy of Haymarket Publishing.
 "Lock-Groove Lullaby" embodies portions of "The Savers", written by Jean Marcel Leroy and Gershon Kingsley.

Personnel
Credits are adapted from the album's liner notes.

Stereolab
 Tim Gane – guitar, Vox organ, Moog synthesizer, bongo drum, tambourine
 Lætitia Sadier – vocals, Vox organ, guitar, tambourine, Moog synthesizer
 Duncan Brown – bass, guitar twang, vocals
 Mary Hansen – vocals, tambourine, guitar
 Sean O'Hagan – Farfisa and Vox organs, guitar
 Andy Ramsay – percussion, Vox organ, bouzouki

Production
 Stereolab (credited as "The Groop") – mixing
 Phil Wright – production, engineering, mixing

Charts

Notes

References

External links
 Transient Random-Noise Bursts with Announcements at official Stereolab website
 
 

1993 albums
Stereolab albums
Elektra Records albums